Robert J. Richards (born 1942) is an author and the Morris Fishbein Distinguished Service Professor of the History of Science and Medicine at the University of Chicago. He has written or edited seven books about the history of science as well as dozens of articles.

He has won several awards, including the Gordon J. Laing Award, the Quantrell Award for excellence in undergraduate teaching, the Pfizer Award, the George Sarton Medal from the History of Science Society and the Laing Prize from the University of Chicago Press and earned a Simon Guggenheim Memorial Fellowship. Richards earned two PhDs: one in the History of Science from the University of Chicago and another in Philosophy from St. Louis University.

Books
Cambridge Companion to the Origin of Species (edited with Michael Ruse) (Cambridge:  Cambridge University Press, 2008).  
Darwinian Heresies (edited with Abigail Lustig and Michael Ruse) (Cambridge:  Cambridge University Press, 2004). 
Darwin and the Emergence of Evolutionary Theories of Mind and Behavior (University of Chicago Press, 1987).  
The Meaning of Evolution:  The Morphological Construction and Ideological Reconstruction of Darwin's Theory (University of Chicago Press, 1992).  
The Tragic Sense of Life: Ernst Haeckel and the Struggle over Evolutionary Thought (University of Chicago Press, 2008). 
The Romantic Conception of Life: Science and Philosophy in the Age of Goethe (University of Chicago Press, 2002).  
Was Hitler a Darwinian? Disputed Questions in the History of Evolutionary Theory (University of Chicago Press, 2013)

References

External links
Robert J. Richards at the University of Chicago
 https://www.uchicago.edu/about/accolades/35/

1942 births
21st-century American historians
21st-century American male writers
Charles Darwin biographers
Historians of Germany
University of Chicago faculty
University of Chicago alumni
Saint Louis University alumni
Living people
American historians of science
American male non-fiction writers